Genc Mulliqi (born 21 January 1966 in Fier, Albania) is an Albanian artist, specialising in sculptures and abstract paintings. He has studied in England and Tirana. Mulliqi lives in Tirana and works as a director at the National Art Gallery of Albania there.

See also

 List of Albanian painters
 List of sculptors

External links
  gencmulliqi.com, his official website

1966 births
20th-century Albanian painters
20th-century sculptors
21st-century Albanian painters
21st-century sculptors
Abstract painters
Albanian expatriates in England
Albanian sculptors
Living people
People from Fier
People from Tirana
20th-century Albanian sculptors
21st-century Albanian sculptors